Vesa Ylinen (born 23 July 1965) is a Finnish former motorcycle speedway rider.

Career
In 1991, Ylinen became the national champion of Finland after winning the Finnish Individual Speedway Championship and the following year he successfully defended his title by winning it again. 

He came to the attention of the Edinburgh Monarchs who signed him for the 1993 British League season, where he would stay for two seasons. A third and fourth Finnish national title was secured in 1995 and 1996 respectively and he would return to the Edinburgh club in 1996, when they were called the Scottish Monarchs.

He won a fifth and final national title in 1998 and then returned to his native Finland to complete his career with Kotkat Seinajoki.

See also 
 Finland national speedway team

References 

Living people
1965 births
Finnish speedway riders
Edinburgh Monarchs riders